Repetition is an album by saxophonist Clifford Jordan which was recorded in New York City in 1984 and released on the Italian Soul Note label.

Reception

In his review on AllMusic, Ken Dryden stated "Clifford Jordan was in top form for this marathon, noon-to-midnight quartet studio session"

Track listing 
All compositions by Clifford Jordan except as indicated
 "Third Avenue" – 6:40
 "Fun" (Clifford Jordan, Barry Harris, Walter Booker, Vernel Fournier) – 3:30
 "Repetition" (Neal Hefti) – 6:36
 "Evidence" (Thelonious Monk) – 4:14
 "Nostalgia/Casbah" (Fats Navarro/Tadd Dameron) – 6:24
 "House Call" – 5:40
 "Quittin' Time" – 7:12

Personnel 
Clifford Jordan – tenor saxophone
Barry Harris – piano
Walter Booker – bass
Vernel Fournier – drums

References 

Clifford Jordan albums
1984 albums
Black Saint/Soul Note albums